Richard Gayozovich Muzaev (born 21 March 1992) is a Russian tennis player.

Career 
Muzaev has a career high ATP singles ranking of 560 achieved on 20 October 2014. He also has a career high ATP doubles ranking of 443 achieved on 16 February 2015. He has won two ITF singles titles and six ITF doubles titles.

Muzaev made his ATP main draw debut at the 2015 Kremlin Cup where he received entry to the doubles main draw as a wildcard entrant, partnering Anton Zaitcev.

External links
 
 

1992 births
Living people
Russian male tennis players
Tennis players from Moscow
Sportspeople from Vladikavkaz
Universiade medalists in tennis
Universiade gold medalists for Russia
Medalists at the 2017 Summer Universiade